Toshihiko Shiozawa is a Japanese football manager and former footballer.

Career

Footballer
Shiozawa first played club football at Meiji University, before professionally debuting in the Japan Soccer League in 1970 for Nagoya Bank. Following the closure of the club at the end of the 1971 season, Shiozawa transferred to Eidai Sangyo where he played until 1975.  During this time, he also acted as assistant coach to Ken Okubo.

Coach
Immediately after retiring from playing in 1975, Shiozawa replaced Okubo as head coach for Eidai SC.  His tenure there did not last long, however, as after only one year, the club was closed down. Shiozawa then took an eight year hiatus from soccer, before returning to coach the football club at Meiji University.  In 1986, he began coaching ANA Yokohama, which had just been promoted to the first division of the Japan Soccer League. Within three years, Shiozawa was able to lead the team to the top position of the league, getting a second and a third place in 1989 and 1990. respectively. In 1991 Shiozawa announced he would be retiring from soccer. He briefly returned in December 2005 and January 2006, as coach of the Nepal national football team.

Honours
 Japan Soccer League Division 2: (1) - 1987-88

References

Bibliography
, 1993 CiNii entry
1989-1990 JSL Year Book, 1989 NAN'UN-DO Publishing
Shu Kamo, 「モダン サッカー へ の 挑戦」 

Expatriate football managers in Nepal
Nepal national football team managers
1947 births
Living people
Japanese football managers
Japanese expatriate football managers
Japanese expatriate sportspeople in Nepal
Yokohama Flügels managers